The Mazda 929 is a full-size car which was sold by the Japanese automobile manufacturer Mazda between 1973 and 1997. Mazda used the 929 nameplate for export markets only, badge engineering its Luce model until 1991 and then transferring the name to export specification Sentia models. Between 1982 and 1986, Mazda also used the 929 nameplate on its Cosmo coupé in certain export markets.

LA2 Series I (1973–1976)

LA2 Series II (1976–1978)

LA4 (1978–1981)

HB (1982–1987)

HC (1986–1991)

HD (1991–1995)

HE (1996–1997) 

929
Cars introduced in 1973